Thompsonville is an unincorporated community in Piute County, Utah, United States, located south-southeast of Marysvale.

Thompsonville is served by Thompsonville Road (Piute County Road 1998), which passes north–south through the community.

Thompsonville Cemetery, a small cemetery, is located in the community along Thompsonville Road.

Geography
Gold Creek passes through the community.

References

Unincorporated communities in Piute County, Utah
Unincorporated communities in Utah